Joseph Haslag (born March 28, 1961) is the Kenneth Lay Chair in Economics for the Department of Economics at University of Missouri in Columbia, Missouri. In addition, he is the executive vice president of the Show-Me Institute, a free market research institute based in St. Louis, Missouri.  He also is executive director of the Economic & Policy Analysis Research Center in Missouri, which prepares forecasts and analyses used by the Missouri General Assembly and administrative units of state government.
He holds a bachelor's degree from the University of Missouri, and a Ph.D. in economics from Southern Methodist University.

Haslag has taught at Southern Methodist University, Erasmus University Rotterdam, and Michigan State University. He  has published his research in the Journal of Monetary Economics, the Journal of Money, Credit and Banking, and the International Economic Review. His research has been cited in more than 1400 academic papers according to Google Scholar.

He grew up in Springfield, Missouri.

External links
 The Show-Me Institute Web site
 Economic and Policy Analysis Research Center
 Vox magazine interview

People from St. Louis
1961 births
Living people
Southern Methodist University alumni
University of Missouri alumni
University of Missouri faculty
20th-century American Jews
Economists from Missouri
21st-century American economists
21st-century American Jews